The Julius Shulman Institute (JSI) at Woodbury University promotes photography of the built environment. The JSI hosts exhibitions, workshops and symposia.

History
In 2005, architectural photographer Julius Shulman founded the Institute at Woodbury University. He chose a university as a home for the JSI because of his interest in education. The endowment supports students, career artists, and commercial photographers who document the physical environment.

Barbara Bestor is Executive Director of the JSI.

Awards

Excellence in Photography
The Excellence in Photography Award is awarded annually by the Institute to honor photographers that challenge the way we look at physical space.

Exhibitions
The Institute hosts and curates exhibitions. The University’s Hollywood gallery (WUHO) is the venue for the majority of exhibitions and events.

References

External links
Official Website
WhiteCreative Website

Woodbury University
American photography organizations
Art in Greater Los Angeles
Organizations based in Los Angeles
Arts organizations established in 2005
2005 establishments in California